Magnus Åserud Skylstad (born 17 June 1983) is a Norwegian musician and record producer from Bergen. He began playing drums at around the age of fifteen years old. He currently is an affiliate of fellow Norwegian and singer-songwriter Aurora and performs as a percussionist, drummer, and occasional backing vocalist for her live band.

Songwriting and production credits

References

Living people
1983 births
Norwegian electronic musicians
Norwegian male musicians
Norwegian songwriters
Norwegian record producers